The following is a comparison of audio over Ethernet and audio over IP audio network protocols and systems.

Notes

References

Audio network protocols
Audio network protocols